Jônatas  "Joe" de Moura Penna (born May 29, 1987) is a Brazilian musician and filmmaker best known from both his YouTube channel MysteryGuitarMan and his feature films. He resides in Los Angeles, California.

YouTube

Penna maintains the YouTube channel MysteryGuitarMan. He registered the channel on June 16, 2006.

By January 2011, MysteryGuitarMan became the most subscribed channel in Brazil. , his channel has garnered over 2.6 million subscribers, and his videos have accrued nearly 400 million views.

On September 11, 2005, Penna launched a second YouTube channel, where he uploads his making-of videos and vlogs. Within 6 hours, it became the third most subscribed channel in Brazil.

In 2007, Penna was one of the first YouTube channels to receive mainstream media coverage, including attention from DC Fox News, after his video The Puzzle was featured on the front page of YouTube.

In 2009, Penna was again seen on the front page of YouTube with his video Guitar: Impossible, which has been covered by De Wereld Draait Door, the highest-rated primetime show in the Netherlands. On December 6, 2009, Penna was featured on FM4, an Austrian national radio station. Shortly after uploaded, his "Guitar: Impossible" video was featured on the MSN.com front page.

Best Buy announced Penna as the $15,000 winner of their Tech-U-Out Video Challenge. He was also a finalist in the "Oreo Global Moments" video competition. Ford selected Penna as a Fiesta Agent for the 2009 Ford Fiesta Movement. Penna's "Guitar: Impossible" video was also featured by YouTube as one of the best videos of 2009.

In 2010, Penna's Root Beer Mozart"l was featured on CNN's morning show Morning Express with Robin Meade and on Germany's nationally broadcast Taff show.

Television 
In 2009, Penna directed an ad in collaboration with Rhett and Link titled T-Shirt War. It garnered international attention. Shortly after, Penna was selected as one of the top 10 new directors at the 20th Cannes Lions Saatchi & Saatchi New Directors' Showcase.

Following the success of the original, Penna and the original cast were hired to produce a national television and cinema spot for Coca-Cola and McDonald's. A year later, Penna directed and starred in yet another commercial for the two companies.

In June 2010, Penna was highlighted by CNN Money on their Best Jobs series.

His stop-motion short film Guitar: Impossible was selected to be displayed at the Guggenheim museum.

In 2012, Penna co-wrote and directed an original interactive thriller series titled Meridian starring Orlando Jones and Rick Overton in conjunction with Fourth Wall Studios.

In August 2014, Penna was announced as the host of Xploration Earth 2050, a technology-oriented television series. Xploration Station went on to receive eight Daytime Emmy Award nominations.

Film 
In March 2016, his short film Turning Point was selected to play at the Tribeca Film Festival.

In February 2017, Penna began production of his directorial debut feature film, Arctic. It was shot in Iceland and stars Mads Mikkelsen. Arctic garnered enthusiastic reviews as an Official Selection for the 2018 Cannes Film Festival. Its theatrical premiere was on February 1, 2019.

In June 2019, Penna began shooting on the sci-fi movie Stowaway starring Anna Kendrick and Toni Collette.

References

External links
 MysteryGuitarMan YouTube homepage
 MysteryGuitarMan's Website

1987 births
21st-century guitarists
21st-century male musicians
Big Frame people
Brazilian expatriates in the United States
Brazilian film directors
Brazilian guitarists
Brazilian Internet celebrities
Brazilian male guitarists
Brazilian YouTubers
Living people
Music YouTubers
People from São Paulo
YouTube filmmakers